Mira Fornay, also known as Mira Fornayová (born 8 May 1977) is a Slovak film director and screenwriter. Her film, My Dog Killer, won the main award at the 2013 International Film Festival Rotterdam. My Dog Killer won three awards at the 2014 Sun in a Net Awards including Best Film, Best Director and Best Screenplay.

Selected filmography

Director
Ex-pozice (2001)
Líštičky (2009)
My Dog Killer (2013)

References

External links

1977 births
Living people
Slovak women film directors
Film people from Bratislava
Sun in a Net Awards winners
Slovak screenwriters